Butebo is a town in the Eastern Region of Uganda. It is the chief municipal, administrative and commercial center of Butebo District.

Location
The geographical coordinates of Butebo are:01°11'40.0"N, 33°55'20.0"E (Latitude:1.194444; Longitude:33.922222).

Points of interest
 The headquarters of Butebo District Local Government
 The offices of Butebo Town Council
 The headquarters of Butebo sub-county
 Butebo Central Market - The largest source of fresh produce in the town
 Butebo Health Centre IV

See also
Butebo District
Eastern Region, Uganda

References

External links
 Website of the Parliament of Uganda

Populated places in Eastern Region, Uganda
Butebo District